Little Grand Rapids is a community in east central Manitoba, Canada, near the Ontario border. It is located approximately 280 kilometers or 173 miles north-northeast from Winnipeg, Manitoba.

It is a fly-in community, with only a winter road.  Planes fly into Little Grand Rapids Airport.  It features a Royal Canadian Mounted Police detachment and a Northern Store.

It is along the Berens River, which is part of the Lake Winnipeg watershed.

Demographics 

References 

Designated places in Manitoba
Hudson's Bay Company trading posts
Northern communities in Manitoba